Women's handball at the 1998 Asian Games was held in Srinakharinwirot University, Bangkok from December 9 to December 14, 1998.

Results
All times are Indochina Time (UTC+07:00)

Final standing

References

Results

External links
Results

Women